The Sikorsky S-18 was a Russian twin engine aircraft designed by Igor Sikorsky and built by the Russian Baltic Railroad Car Works aviation division at Petrograd during World War I.

Design and development
The S-18 was a large three bay biplane fighter/interceptor powered by two  Sunbeam Crusader V-8  water-cooled engines mounted on the lower wing in a pusher configuration. The aircraft featured armor protection for both crew members with the gunner/observer seated in the nose and armed with a single machine gun. The aircraft was very heavy and with the less than reliable Sunbeam engines neither example built was able to leave the ground.

Specifications

References

S-18
Biplanes
S-18
Single-engined tractor aircraft